Sean Scully  (born 30 June 1945) is an Irish-born American-based artist working as a painter, printmaker, sculptor and photographer. His work is held in museum collections worldwide and he has twice been named a Turner Prize nominee. Moving from London to New York in 1975, Scully helped lead the transition from Minimalism to Emotional abstraction in painting, abandoning the reduced vocabulary of Minimalism in favor of a return to metaphor and spirituality in art.

Scully has also been a lecturer and professor at a number of universities and his writing and teachings are collected in the 2016 book, Inner: The Collected Writings and Selected Interviews of Sean Scully.

Early life
Sean Scully was born in Dublin, Ireland, on 30 June 1945. Four years later his family moved to London where they lived in a working-class part of south London, moving from lodging to lodging for a number of years. By the age of 9, Scully knew he wanted to become an artist, and from the age of 15 until he was 17, Scully was apprenticed at a commercial printing shop in London as a typesetter, an experience that greatly influenced the art to come.

From the age of 17 until he turned 20, despite working full-time in various jobs including graphic design, and messenger, Scully attended evening classes at the Central School of Art, focused on figurative painting. While working a stint as a plasterer's labourer on the Victoria Station Ballroom, Scully made daily visits to the Tate Milbank to visit Van Gogh's Chair (1888), which made an impression on him. In 1963, at the age of 18, Scully had a job loading trucks with flattened boxes at a cardboard factory. The idea of stacking central to much of his work came from this experience.

Education 
In September 1965 Sean Scully, age 20, began to study full-time at Croydon College of Art, London, before moving on to Newcastle University in 1968. At Newcastle University, the University Theatre's production of Samuel Beckett’s Waiting for Godot made a lasting impact on him. Scully was also influenced by a trip to Morocco in 1969, where he became fascinated by the multi-colored stripes locals wove into wool tents and robes. Scully was awarded the Frank Knox Memorial Fellowship in 1972 to attend Harvard University. It was during this first stay in the US that Scully began to experiment with new techniques such as tape and spray paint.

Career

Early career: 1970–1980 
Scully's first commercial show, at the Rowan Gallery in London, sold out. During this period Scully taught at the Chelsea College of Art and Design, and Goldsmith's, while continuing to paint in his Elephant Lane studio in Rotherhithe. In 1975, at the age of 30, Scully was awarded a two-year Harkness Fellowship with which he moved to New York.

Once in New York he began to develop important friendships with fellow artists such as Robert Ryman, and others in academic and artistic circles. Scully's response in the 1970s had been to bring the objectives of American Minimalism together with those of Op art, an important current in Europe, creating works using overlays and “supergrids” that bridged these two artistic movements in a new way. Once in New York, Minimalism had a strong influence on his work, and for a few years Scully's palette was reduced to the grey monochrome ‘Black paintings’ series.

Scully began working on the series known as The Catherine Paintings in 1979, while sharing his Duane Street studio with his third wife, the artist Catherine Lee. The idea behind the series was to choose the important painting Scully produced during each year together, that would then become part of a collection named after her. This was the beginning of Sean's own private collection of his work.

Departure from Minimalism: 1980–1982 

By 1980 Scully considered himself to be at war with the movement of Minimalism in New York and wanted to bring more human elements into his art. He made multiple trips to Morocco and Mexico during this time, as he considered these trips to have “a direct bearing on what I think art should be doing – which is concentrating on what’s interesting, engaging, perverse, and beautiful about human nature.” He later commented that “I had decided that what had been stripped out of painting—i.e., the ability to make relationships, to be metaphorical and referential, spiritual, poetic, all those things and aspects of human nature—had to be put back in if painting was to go forward.”
In 1981 the first retrospective of Sean Scully's work was held at the Ikon Gallery in Birmingham. This was also the year that Scully's confidence to withdraw from an adherence to Minimalism became apparent, with the return of color and space, and the freehand drawing of stripes and visible brushstrokes, rather than the hard lines of tape. Scully had a breakthrough with the seminal 1981 painting Backs and Fronts, which had a profound impact in the 1982 exhibition ‘Critical Perspectives’ at the PS1 Contemporary Art Center. This was a watershed painting which British conceptual artist Gillian Wearing has said “broke the logjam of American minimalist painting”.

Geometric Abstraction: 1982–present 
In 1982 Scully began to work with the gallerist David McKee, an important relationship that lasted for a decade. During the summer of that year, Scully started producing small multi-panel works on found pieces of wood while staying in Montauk at the Edward Albee artist's colony. These works were titled Ridge, Plum, and Bear after the islands that surround Long Island. He also began applying a combination of rigid geometry and expressive texture and color to larger paintings that year. A prime example of this was Heart of Darkness, inspired by the 1899 novella of the same name. Scully began collaborating with Mohammad O. Khalil in 1983, this was the first time he had collaborated with a printmaker and was the start of a career-long commitment to printmaking.

In 1984, the Museum of Modern Art included Scully in their International Survey of Recent Painting and Sculpture. The following year Scully's first American solo museum exhibition was held at the Museum of Art, Carnegie Institute in 1985, and traveled to the Museum of Fine Arts, Boston. Other major museums also began to acquire Scully's large-scale paintings, despite the dominant trend of the time tending towards Postmodernism. Scully's paintings from this period are heavy and physical in terms of both size and aesthetic, and make use of large-scale stretchers.

By 1987, Scully's work became less complex, flatter and smaller in scale, and began to include lighter color palettes beginning with Pale Fire in 1988. The same year, while experimenting with watercolors on a beach in Mexico, Scully created the first image that would become an extended meditation on architecture and light with the Wall of Light series. In 1989 the Whitechapel Gallery in London held a solo exhibition for Scully, which then traveled to Palacio Velázquez in Madrid and to the Städtische Galerie im Lenbachhaus in Munich. These were Scully's first solo exhibitions in mainland Europe. The art critic Robert Hughes' 1989 piece for TIME magazine cemented Scully's increasing reputation.

The painting Why and What (Yellow) in 1988 was the first to incorporate an inset element of steel. By 1991 Scully expanded the use of steel, setting oil on linen insets into large steel panels. He also began the regular use of a checkerboard motif at this time, first hinted at in his Taped and Hidden Drawing paintings of the mid 1970s. In 1992, while teaching at Harvard University, Sean Scully revisited Morocco to film the BBC documentary The Artist's Journey: Sean Scully on Henri Matisse, with Matisse having visited Morocco in 1912 - 1913. 1993 saw the first exhibition of The Catherine Paintings, at the Modern Art Museum of Fort Worth, Texas. In 1994 he opened a second studio in Barcelona, and he returned to Morocco in 1995, to spend more time in the country. Atlas Walls is a portfolio of Scully's photographic works taken during this trip.

In 1995 Scully returned to New York, moving into a large new studio in Chelsea, Manhattan. Chelsea Wall was the first painting to be made there. Scully received a number of invitations to speak at academic institutions, and participated in the Joseph Beuys lectures on the state of contemporary art in Britain, Europe and the US, held by the Ruskin School at Oxford University, England. In 1997, Scully's photography was exhibited for the first time at the Sala de Exposiciones Rekalde in Bilbao, Spain.

Scully participated in a colloquium in conjunction with the exhibition Richard Pousette-Dart at the Metropolitan Museum of Art in 1998. He visited Santo Domingo in 1999, resulting in the photography portfolio Santa Domingo for Nené. That year, Scully's prints were given a retrospective at the Graphische Sammlung Albertina, in Vienna, Austria, and the Musée du Dessin et de l’Estampe Originale in Gravelines. A catalogue raisonné of his prints from 1969 - 1999 was also published.

2001 - 2013 
In 2001, the Modern Art Museum of Fort Worth acquired the complete Catherine series, eighteen paintings that each represent a year from the period 1979–1996, which was given a dedicated room for permanent exhibition in the new Museum building opened in 2002. In 2002 Scully was appointed Professor of Painting at the Academy of Fine Arts, Munich, a position he held through to 2007. A retrospective exhibition opened in 2004 at the Sara Hildén Art Museum in Tampere, Finland, which travelled to Klassik Stiftung Weimar, in Germany, and the National Gallery of Australia. While in Australia, Scully spent time traveling through the red desert interior. 

Between 2005 - 2006, Sean Scully's Wall of Light series was displayed at museums around the United States. This began with the exhibition Sean Scully: Wall of Light opened at The Phillips Collection, Washington D.C., and traveled to the Modern Art Museum of Fort Worth, the Cincinnati Art Museum, and finally the Metropolitan Museum of Fine Art to great acclaim. The same year Scully travelled with a group of students from the Art Academy in Munich, to Inisheer, an island off the Irish coast. It was here that the Aran portfolio of photographs were taken. In 2006 the Hugh Lane Gallery opened The Sean Scully Room, a dedicated, permanent installation of the artist's work, and the Bibliothèque nationale de France held an exhibition of his prints. Sean Scully: A Retrospective opened in 2007 at the Fundació Joan Miró, Barcelona, and travelled to the Musée d'art moderne (Saint-Étienne), and the Museo d’Arte Contemporanea Roma (MACRO) in Rome. The National Gallery of Art in Washington D.C. invited Scully to give the Elson Lecture in 2007.

The retrospective exhibition Constantinople or the Sensual Concealed: The Imagery of Sean Scully opened in 2009 at the MKM Museum Küppersmühlefür Moderne Kunst, in Duisburg, Germany, and traveled to the Ulster Museum, Belfast. In 2010 a tour of important early works from the 1980s started at the Centre for Contemporary Arts, Carlow, Ireland, and then traveled to the Leeds Art Gallery, and the Wilhelm-Hack-Museum in Ludwigshafen am Rhein. In 2011 the Chazen Museum of Art opened their new expansion of the museum with a solo exhibition of Scully's eight-part Liliane paintings on aluminum, and other works. Scully opened nine more solo museum exhibitions in 2012, including Notations: Sean Scully at the Philadelphia Museum of Art, as well as exhibitions at museums like MIMA, Kunstmuseum Bern, the Lentos Kunstmuseum in Linz, and IVAM in Valencia, Spain.

Reception in China and new projects: 2014–2017 
In 2014, Scully opened a new studio space set in three acres in Tappan, New York, where he continued to extend the Landline series of painting begun in 2000. That same year, Scully opened fourteen solo exhibitions around the world, including the first major retrospective by a western artist in China. The exhibition, entitled Follow the Heart: The Art of Sean Scully, opened in Beijing. The exhibition included China Piled-Up, a new monumental sculpture in corten-steel, and traveled from the Shanghai Himalayas Museum to the CAFA Art Museum in Beijing, to critical acclaim. Another outdoor sculpture Boxes Full of Air was commissioned at Chateau La Coste in France.

Scully participated in the Venice Biennale for the first time, in 2015, with the solo exhibition Land Sea at the Palazzo Falier in Venice. The Museum Liaunig, in Neuhaus, Austria, opened its new building expansion with Sean Scully: Painting as an Imaginative World Appropriation. To honor his long-term friendship with art critic Arthur Danto who died in 2013, Scully published the book Danto on Scully, bringing together the series of five essays Danto had written on the artist over the previous 20 years.

In 2015 Scully completed his restoration of the 10th Church of Santa Cecília de Montserrat in Spain, and opened it to the public. Commissioned by the Museum of Montserrat to make a holistic artistic intervention in the sacred space, Scully not only permanently installed paintings but worked on site-specific frescoes, and the design of the altar and cross. The chapel is now both a working church, and also the Espai d’Art Sean Scully. Scully was awarded the V Congreso Asociacion Protecturi for his contribution to Spanish religious heritage

In 2016 Scully's second major exhibition in China, Sean Scully: Resistance and Persistence, opened at the Art Museum of the Nanjing University of the Arts, and travelled to the Guangdong Museum and the Hubei Museum in Wuhan. In the same year, as well as solo museum exhibitions in Budweis, Czech Republic, and Valencia, Spain, the artist put together two exhibitions of works from specific early periods in his private collection, one of works from the 1970s, in an off-site space in Ridgewood, Queens with Cheim & Read, and another of works from the 1980s with Mnuchin Gallery. Inspired by revisiting his earlier works, Scully began to reemploy techniques such as spray painting, that he first introduced in the late 1960s.

Over the course of 2015 - 2017, Scully's work expanded in two particular directions: sculpture and figuration. During this period, Scully began working on sculptural projects, including the Tower series using various materials such as corten steel, marble, and stainless steel, and the Stack series in both raw and painted steel were introduced. A new series of Block paintings were begun, in which Scully self-referenced his sculpture in paint. This new direction was the focus of the solo exhibition Wall of Light Cubed at Cheim & Read, NY. Scully also revisited his early exploration in figuration from the late 1960s in a series of figurative paintings titled Eleuthera which was completed between 2015 and 2017. The series was inspired by Scully's son Oisin, and was named after the island of Eleuthera in the Bahamas and the feminine Greek adjective ἐλεύθερος (eleútheros), meaning "free".

2018 
2018 saw Scully have a total of fourteen public exhibitions around the world. This included the installation of the monumental sculpture Boxes of Air in the Cuadra San Cristóbal, in Mexico City, along with paintings installed in the horse stalls of the iconic pink stable block. Other museum shows included: Multimedia Art Museum, Moscow; Hatton and Laing Galleries, Newcastle, UK; De Pont Museum of Contemporary Art, Tilburg, Netherlands; Russian Museum, St Petersburg, Russia; Staatliche Kunsthalle Karlsruhe, Germany; Yorkshire Sculpture Park, UK, among many others.

In 2019, the exhibition Sean Scully: Sea Star opened at The National Gallery, London, showcasing Scully's work alongside works by J. M. W. Turner. On April 6, 2019 director Nick Willing's documentary film Unstoppable. Sean Scully & The Art of Everything aired nationally in the UK on BBC Two. For the 58th Venice Biennale, Scully presented Sean Scully: Human at the Basilica of San Giorgio Maggiore, an exhibition of recent paintings and a new sculpture titled Opulent Ascension under the dome of the High Renaissance church by Palladio.

Critical reception 
Arthur Danto wrote that “Sean Scully’s name belongs on the shortest of short lists of the major painters of our time”, continuing that “Scully’s historical importance lies in the way he has brought the great achievement of Abstract Expressionist painting into the contemporary moment - and in a way overcome the terms of the paragon that sent painting into exile.”

Prizes and awards 
Scully has been a member of Aosdána since 2001, and the Royal Academy of Arts since 2013. Scully received an Honorary Doctor of Fine Arts degree from both Massachusetts College of Art and the National University of Ireland in 2003, and a Doctor of Letters degree from Newcastle University. He received an Honorary Doctorate from Miguel Hernández University in 2006 and 2008.

Other works

Music 
Scully's mother Holly was a Vaudeville singer, and Sean Scully became heavily influenced by rhythm and blues in his adolescence. Scully owned and ran an R&B Club as a teenager in South London, and was briefly in an R&B band with his brother and a friend.

In 2016 the percussionist Billy Martin from the band Medeski Martin & Wood made a performative collaboration with Sean Scully's monumental corten steel sculpture Boxes of Air at Scully's Tappan studio. It culminated in ‘Boxing for Sean’, a 6 movement percussion composition performed live outdoors.

In 2019 the duo Merzouga released a 46' sound-composition "The Language of Light - Music to the Work of Sean Scully" (YLE/DLF 2019) featuring the texts and the voice of Sean Scully. Its premiere broadcast was on Dec 3, 2019 at 9pm local time on Finnish broadcaster Yleisradio. German nationwide broadcaster Deutschlandfunk co-produced the piece, the German broadcast is scheduled for February 2020

Writing 
Scully first began writing about art and his own work in the 1980s, although he only truly began to include writing as part of his practice from 1996 onwards. 2016 saw the publication of Inner: the collected writings and selected interviews of Sean Scully, by HatjeCantz

Personal life 
Scully became a father at the age of 19, with the birth of his son Paul on May 7, 1965. Paul later died in a car accident in 1983 at the age of 18. While at Newcastle University, Scully met Rosemary Purnell, a fellow student in the Painting Department, they married in 1971 and later divorced. Scully married artist Catherine Lee in 1978, the two divorced in 1998. In 2006, he married artist Liliane Tomasko, his fourth wife. Their son Oisin Scully was born in 2009.

Public Collections

United States and South America 

 Ackland Art Museum, University of North Carolina, Chapel Hill NC
 Albright–Knox Art Gallery – Buffalo, NY
 Art Institute of Chicago – Chicago, IL
 Art Gallery of Ontario - Ontario, Canada
 The Broad Art Foundation, Los Angeles, CA
 Carnegie Museum of Art – Pittsburgh, PA
 Iris & B. Gerald Cantor Center for Visual Arts, Stanford University - Stanford, CA
 Carpenter Center for the Visual Arts, Harvard University, Cambridge, MA
 Centro Cultural de Arte Contemporaneo – Mexico City, Mexico
 Chase Manhattan Bank – New York, NY
 Chemical Bank – New York, NY
 Cincinnati Art Museum – Cincinnati, OH
 Cleveland Museum of Art – Cleveland, OH
 Contemporary Museum - Honolulu, HI
 Corcoran Gallery of Art – Washington, D.C.
 Dallas Museum of Art – Dallas, TX
 David Winton Bell Gallery, List Art Center, Brown University, Providence, RI
 Denver Art Museum – Denver, CO
 Des Moines Art Center – Des Moines, IA
 De Young Museum - San Francisco, CA
 First Bank Minneapolis – Minneapolis, MN
 Fogg Art Museum, Harvard University – Cambridge, MA
 Ft. Lauderdale Museum of Art - Ft. Lauderdale, FL
 Glenstone – Potomac, MD
 Guggenheim Museum – New York, NY
 Hirshhorn Museum and Sculpture Garden – Washington, D.C.
 High Museum of Art – Atlanta, GA
 Hood Museum of Art – Hanover, NH
 Kemper Museum of Contemporary Art, Kansas City, MO 
 Los Angeles County Museum of Art - Los Angeles, CA
 Modern Art Museum of Fort Worth – Fort Worth, TX
 Catherine Series
 BNY Mellon Center – Pittsburgh, PA
 Metropolitan Museum of Art – New York, NY
 Miami Art Museum - Miami, FL
 Mount Holyoke College Art Museum, South Hadley, MA
 Museo de Arte Contemporaneo – Caracas, Venezuela
 Museo de Arte Contemporaneo – Monterrey, Mexico
 Museo de Arte Moderno - Col. Bosques de Chapultepec, Mexico
 Museo de Arte Moderno – Mexico City, Mexico
 Museum of Fine Art, Boston - Boston MA
 Museum of Fine Arts, Houston– Houston, TX
 Museum of Modern Art – New York, NY
 National Gallery of Art – Washington, D.C.
 8.10.89 (1989)
 Orlando Museum of Art – Orlando, FL
 Paine Webber Group, Inc. – New York, NY
 Philip Morris, Inc. – New York, NY
 The Phillips Collection - Washington, D.C.
 Princeton University Art Museum, Princeton, NJ
 Rose Art Museum, Brandeis University, Waltham, MA
 Santa Barbara Museum of Art – Santa Barbara, CA
 Seattle Museum of Art, Seattle, WA
 Sheldon Memorial Art Gallery and Sculpture Garden, University of Nebraska – Lincoln, NE
 Smith College Museum of Art – Northampton, MA
 Smithsonian American Art Museum, Washington, DC
 Works in the SAAM collection
 Snite Museum of Art – Notre Dame, IN
 San Diego Museum of Art - San Diego, CA
 Saint Louis Art Museum – Saint Louis, MO
 Speed Art Museum — Louisville, KY 
 Van Cliburn Foundation, Fort Worth, TX
 Walker Art Center – Minneapolis, MN
 Whitney Museum of Modern Art, New York, NY
 Yale University Art Gallery – New Haven, CT

Europe 

 Abbot Hall Art Gallery – Kendal, England
 Academy of Fine Arts, Munich, Germany
 Albertina – Vienna, Austria
 Arts Council of Great Britain – London, England
 AXA Belgique, Bruxelles, Belgium
 Banque Européenne d’Investissement – Luxembourg
 BAWAG, Vienna, Austria
 Bavarian State Painting Collections – Munich, Germany
 Bibliothèque nationale de France - Paris, France
 Birmingham Museum of Art – Birmingham, England
 British Council – London, England
 Centre national des arts plastiques, Paris, France
 Ceolfrith Art Center – Sunderland, England
 Château Lynch-Bages - Pauillac, France
 Museo Chillida-Leku, - Hernani, Spain
 Coleccion Conei, Barcelona, Catalonia, Spain
 Consejería de cultura - Santander, Spain
 Contemporary Arts Society – London, England
 Council of National Academic Awards – London, England
 Crawford Art Gallery – Cork, Ireland
 East Coast Light I (1973)
 Centre de la gravure et de l’image imprimee, La Louvière - Bruxelles, Belgium
 Daimler Art Collection – Stuttgart, Germany
 Deutsche Bank - London, UK
 DZ Bank AG Kunst sammlung / KMMM - Frankfurt, Germany
 Eastern Arts Association – Cambridge, England
 Ecole d’Arts Plastiques - Châtellerault, France
 Espace de l’Art Concret - Mouans-Sartoux, France
 EMMA, ESPOO, Museum of Modern Art – Helsinki, Finland
 Fitzwilliam Museum – Cambridge, England
 La Fondation Edelman – Lausanne, Switzerland
 Fondation Urvasco – Vittoria, Spain
 Foundation Stiftelsen Focus - Boras, Sweden
 CaixaForum Barcelona – Barcelona, Catalonia, Spain
 Fundació Allorda-Derksen, Barcelona, Catalonia, Spain
 Fundación Caixa Galicia - La Coruña, Spain
 Gallery of Modern Art László Vass Collection - Veszprém, Hungary
 Gertsev Collection, Moscow, Russia
 Hôtel des Arts - Toulon, France
 Hunterian Art Gallery – Glasgow, Scotland
 Hugh Lane Gallery – Dublin, Ireland
 Works in the Hugh Lane collection
 Institut Valencià d'Art Modern (IVAM) – València, Spain
 Irish Museum of Modern Art (IMMA) – Dublin, Ireland
 Kunsthalle Bielefeld – Bielefeld, Germany
 Kunstmuseum Lentos Linz, Linz, Austria
 Kunstsammlung Nordrhein-Westfalen – Düsseldorf, Germany
 Kunsthaus Zürich – Zürich, Switzerland
 Kunst und Museumsverein Wuppertal – Wuppertal, Germany
 Laing Art Gallery – Newcastle-Upon-Tyne, England
 László Vass Collection, Veszprém, Hungary’
 Leicestershire Educational Authority – Leicester, England
 Louisiana Museum of Modern Art – Humlebaek, Denmark
 The Maramotti Collection, Reggio-Emilia, Italy
 Manchester Art Gallery– Manchester, England
 Museum Folkwang – Essen, Germany
 Musée d'Art Contemporain du Val-de-Marne, Vitry-sur-Seine, France
 Musée d'art moderne (Saint-Étienne) – Saint-Etienne, France
 Musee du Dessin et de l’Estampe Originale – Gravelines, France
 Musée Jenisch - Vevey, Switzerland
 Musee National d´Art Moderne, Centre Georges Pompidou - Paris, France
 Musee de Roland-Garros - Paris, France
 Museo d'Arte Moderna di Bologna (MAMBO), Bologna, Italy
 Museo Nacional Centro de Arte Reina Sofía – Madrid, Spain
 Barcelona Museum of Contemporary Art - Barcelona, Catalonia, Spain
 Mumok, Stiftung Ludwig – Vienna, Austria
 Museum Pfalzgalerie – Kaiserslautern, Germany
 National Museum Cardiff – Cardiff, Wales
 Northern Arts Association - Newcastle-Upon-Tyne, England
 Norwich Castle, Norwich, England
 Open Museum, Environmental & Heritage Resource Centre, Leicestershire, England
 Pier Arts Centre – Orkney, Scotland
 Ruhr University Bochum - Bochum, Germany
 Saastamoisen Saatio - Helsinki, Finland
 Sala Rekalde - Bilbao, Spain
 Sammlung Essl - Vienna, Austria
 Sara Hilden Art Museum - Tampere, Finland
 Staatsgalerie Stuttgart – Stuggart, Germany
 Staatliche Museen Kassel, Neue Galerie - Kassel, Germany
 Staatliche Graphische Sammlung München, Munich, Germany
 Lenbachhaus – Munich, Germany
 Tate Modern – London, England
 Works in the Tate collection
 The UBS Art Collection – Zurich/Basel, Switzerland
 Ulster Museum – Belfast, Northern Ireland
 Northumbria University, Newcastle, England
 Victoria and Albert Museum – London, England
 Von der Heydt Museum, Wuppertal, Germany
 Whitworth Art Gallery – Manchester, England
 Willy Michel Collection, Museum Franz Gertsch, Burgdorf, Switzerland
 ZKM Center for Art and Media Karlsruhe (ZKM) – Karlsruhe, Germany
 University of Limerick – Limmerick, Ireland

Australia 

 Art Gallery of New South Wales – Sydney, Australia
 National Gallery of Australia – Canberra, Australia
 National Gallery of Victoria – Felton Bequest – Melbourne, Australia
 Power Institute of Contemporary Art – Sydney, Australia

Japan 

 Bridgestone Museum of Art, Ishibashi Foundation - Tokyo, Japan
 Nagoya City Art Museum - Nagoya
 Tokyo International Forum - Tokyo

Bibliography

Selected works about Scully

Selected works by Sean Scully

Solo and two person exhibition catalogues

Quotes 

 “Art, especially abstraction: has to be a moral act. If not it’s likely to fall into bed with decoration.”
 “Why stripes? Because they can be anything. And they can be anything because they are nothing. To make nothing into something is more interesting that making something into something else. The association with the devil notwithstanding”
 “Artistic culture, to me, is like a huge rug that is constantly folded and unfolded by us. Every time it’s turned over, turned out, unfolded: it shows something new or something overlooked that now seems new.”

References

Sources

Dorothy Walker (2002). Scully, Seán in Brian Lalor (Ed.), The Encyclopedia of Ireland. Dublin: Gill and Macmillan. .
Arthur C. Danto (2007). "Architectural Principles in the Art of Sean Scully", Border Crossings: A Magazine of the Arts, vol. 26(3), August 2007, p. 62–67. ISSN 0831-2559.
Arthur C. Danto. (2005). "Sean Scully". Unnatural Wonders: Essays from the Gap Between Art and Life. NY: Columbia University Press. p. 81. .
Joan Marter (2011). "Sean Scully". Grove Encyclopedia of American Art. Oxford University Press. .
David Carrier (1994). The Aesthete in the : The Philosophy and Practice of American Abstract Painting in the 1980s. Penn State Press. 1994. .
Donald Kuspit (2010). "Sacred Sadness: Sean Scully's Abstractions", Psychodrama: Modern Art as Group Therapy. London: Ziggurat. pp. 449–453. .
David Carrier (2008). A World Art History and Its Objects. Penn State Press. 2008. .
Sean Scully (2016). Inner: The Collected Writings and Selected Interviews of Sean Scully. .

External links
Sean Scully Website
 
Aosdána biographical note
Santa Cecilia Montserrat Sean Scully Art Space
Sean Scully: 'There are no certainties in my paintings' – video The Guardian, February 2011
 Profile on Royal Academy of Arts Collections

 
20th-century American painters
American male painters
21st-century American painters
20th-century Irish painters
21st-century Irish painters
Irish male painters
Irish contemporary artists
Abstract artists
Alumni of Newcastle University
Harvard University alumni
Academic staff of the Academy of Fine Arts, Munich
Royal Academicians
Aosdána members
People from County Dublin
Living people
1945 births
20th-century American printmakers